Sir Herbert Charles Perrott, 5th and 1st Baronet,  (26 October 1849 – 15 February 1922) was an English baronet who succeeded to a 1716 baronetcy in 1886 and was created a baronet in his own right on 21 June 1911 with precedence to his heirs male from the 1716 creation. Since there were no sons, the baronetcies became extinct with his death in 1922.

Background
Perrott was elder son of Sir Edward George Lambert Perrott, 4th Baronet (died 1886) by his wife
Emma Maria Houghton (died 1878), only dau. of Charles Evelyn Houghton, commander R.N., descended in the female line, from John Evelyn.

The 1716 baronetcy had been created for Sir Robert Perrott, styled 1st Bart., of Richmond, Surrey (died 1759), a relative of Sir John Perrot, lord deputy of Ireland in the reign of Queen Elizabeth. It was claimed that he was created a baronet on 1 July 1716 with limitation to his brother and the heirs male of his body, in reward for eminent diplomatic services, but no patent was registered in the College of Arms. Thus, the nephew Sir Richard Perrott (lineal ancestor of Sir Herbert) assumed the style of Baronet, but was not presumably so recognized. The 1911 creation was probably designed to overcome the failure to register the patent at the time of creation.

The 3rd Baronet, Sir Edward Bindloss Perrott (1784–1859) married in 1810, Louisa Augusta Bayly (died 1860, aged 81), a niece of Henry Bayly Paget, 1st Earl of Uxbridge, and cousin of the 1st Marquess of Anglesey, K.G, already a notable war hero.  Sir Herbert was therefore a third cousin of the 3rd Marquess of Anglesey.

Career
Perrott was Chief Secretary of the St. John Ambulance Association from its formation in 1877 and secretary-general of the Most Venerable Order of the Hospital of St. John of Jerusalem in England from 1910. He was made Companion of the Order of the Bath (CB) in the October 1902 South African Honours list, for home service to the war effort during the Second Boer War. After the First world war, he was appointed a Companion of Honour (CH) in the 1918 Birthday Honours.

Family
He married on 10 December 1901 at St Peter's Eaton Square, London, Ethel Lucy Hare (1875 – 1939), eldest daughter of the late Captain Marcus Augustus Stanley Hare, R.N., of Court Grange, Newton Abbott. Lady Perrott was appointed a Lady of Grace of the Order of the Hospital of Saint John of Jerusalem in England (DStJ) on 8 May 1902.

They had issue, two daughters:
 Marie Louise Priscilla Perrott, later Baroness Forester (born 20 December 1909 – 1988), wife as of 1931 of the 7th Baron Forester since 1931. They had issue one son and four daughters, of whom the two eldest daughters Christine Helene and Juliet Mary married the 7th Baron Bolton and the 8th Marquess of Downshire respectively. Lady Forester had a royal godparent in H.H. Princess Marie Louise of Schleswig-Holstein.
 Helena Ruth Perrott, later Viscountess Maitland (1912-1 September 1999, aged 87), died as Helena, Viscountess Maitland; she married 1936 Ivor Colin, Viscount Maitland, (29 August 1915 – 18 January 1943), killed in action in North Africa, aged 27, only son and heir of Ian Maitland, 15th Earl of Lauderdale and had issue three daughters, of whom the eldest Mary Helena married the 4th Baron Biddulph.

References

1849 births
1922 deaths
Baronets in the Baronetage of Great Britain
Baronets in the Baronetage of the United Kingdom
Companions of the Order of the Bath
Members of the Order of the Companions of Honour
Herbert